The Rectory School is an independent, coeducational, junior boarding (5–9) and day school (K–9) in Pomfret, Connecticut. The school was founded by the Rev. Frank H. Bigelow in 1920.

Rectory's campus is located on Connecticut Route 169, immediately north of the Pomfret School.

Academics
All students must receive education in music. The school requires that students take classes on various genres of music, and many choose to supplement this with private lessons arranged by the school. Every student also takes part in sports on levels that test the skilled athlete and encourage the beginner.

Rectory's Individualized Instruction Program (IIP) provides students in need of extra support with daily one-on-one assistance from an assigned faculty tutor. Students meet with their tutors within the regular rotation of classes during the academic day, when their peers are in study hall. The program is customized to each student, helping students with language disorders develop skills in language and reading comprehension, foreign-language students  master English, and students with attention-deficit disorders develop study habits and accountability.

The Rectory School is accredited by the Connecticut Association of Independent Schools and the National Association for the Education of Young Children, and approved by the Connecticut State Board of Education. Memberships include the National Association of Independent Schools, The Connecticut Association of Independent Schools, the Association of Boarding Schools, and the New England Preparatory School Athletic Council.

Athletics 
Students are required to participate in the sports program every trimester, and attend practice each day immediately after classes. The school fields numerous teams for most sports so that students can play at a level appropriate to them. 

Fall athletic offerings
Cross Country
Dance
Equestrian
Soccer
Volleyball
Football

Winter athletic offerings
Basketball
Fencing
Ice hockey
Squash
Swimming
Wrestling 

Spring athletic offerings
Baseball
Golf
Lacrosse
Softball
Tennis
Track and field

Dormitories 
All boarding students are grouped into dormitories attended to by two faculty members, the "dorm parents". These residential communities form the core of the students' relations. 

Boys' dorms
Doris G. Bigelow Dormitory (DGB)
Hamilton Dormitory
Fisher Dormitory
Faraway Dormitory

Girls' dorms
Father Bigelow Memorial Dormitory
Dining Dormitory
Murphy Dormitory
Out-of-Bounds Dormitory

Outreach 
The school runs Hoops for Hunger, a yearly basketball clinic that charges canned goods as admission. The proceeds are donated to local food banks. The program was founded by longtime basketball, cross-country, and baseball coach Brad 'Coach' Seaward in 1997.

Notable alumni
Robert Ludlum - Author best known for the Jason Bourne novels
William Reese "Will" Owsley III - Grammy-nominated musician
Peter L. Pond - Clergyman, activist and philanthropist
Peter Kellogg - American businessman and philanthropist
Julian Roosevelt - Olympic Gold Medalist
Oscar Tang - Financier and philanthropist
Gabriel Traversari - Nicaraguan-American actor, director, writer, singer & songwriter
Christian Vital - Professional basketball player
Terrence Clarke - Basketball player and NBA Draft prospect
Jeremy Thorpe - British politician who served as leader of the Liberal Party
Bernard Ryan Jr. - American writer

References

External links

Private middle schools in Connecticut
Boarding schools in Connecticut
Educational institutions established in 1920
Schools in Windham County, Connecticut
Pomfret, Connecticut
Private elementary schools in Connecticut
1920 establishments in Connecticut